Irving J. Waldron (January 24, 1876 - July 22, 1944) was a Major League Baseball player. He played outfield for the Milwaukee Brewers and the Washington Senators in the 1901 season. He was born in Hillside, New York on January 21, 1876. Waldron played 141 games in 1901, his only season. He got 186 hits with an average of .311. Irv had 0 home runs, 52 RBIs, 102 runs scored, and 20 stolen bases. After his Major League career ended, Waldron played minor league baseball until 1910 before retiring from the game. Irv Waldron was 5 foot 5, batted right-handed and threw right-handed. He died on July 22, 1944, in Worcester, Massachusetts.

References

External links
Baseball-Reference.com

Milwaukee Brewers (1901) players
Washington Senators (1901–1960) players
1876 births
1944 deaths
Baseball players from New York (state)
Pawtucket Phenoms players
Milwaukee Brewers (minor league) players
St. Joseph Saints players
Milwaukee Creams players
Kansas City Blue Stockings players
San Francisco Seals (baseball) players
Kansas City Blues (baseball) players
Denver Grizzlies (baseball) players
Lincoln Railsplitters players
Scranton Miners players
Utica Utes players
Meridian White Ribbons players